Ernst Schmidt was a German Communist.

Ernst Schmidt may also refer to:

Ernst Schmidt (engineer), inventor of Schmidt hammer and Schmidt number
Ernst Schmidt, character in The Cloverfield Paradox
Ernst Schmidt (physician)
Ernst Schmidt (bobsleigh)

See also
Ernest Schmidt, basketball player
Ernst Schmitz, zoologist and priest